Masayoshi Son (born 11 August 1957) is a Japanese billionaire technology entrepreneur, investor and philanthropist. A 3rd generation "Zainichi Korean", he naturalized as a Japanese citizen in 1990. He is the founder, chairman and chief executive officer (CEO) of the Japanese holding company SoftBank, CEO of SoftBank Mobile and chairman of UK-based Arm Holdings.

Since Son founded SoftBank in 1981, he has made many investments, but the vast majority of those deals failed, and his reputation as an investor rests almost solely on his $20 million investment in Alibaba Group in 2000, a stake that was worth $130 billion in 2018. The morphing of his own telecom company SoftBank Corp. into an investment management firm called SoftBank Group Corp. made him noted worldwide as a stock investor. However, after a number of high-profile setbacks, Son's investing strategy in the first and second SoftBank Vision Funds established in 2017 and 2019, has been described as one reliant on the greater fool theory. A controversial figure, Son has been called a gambler, mocked by some specialized media and dubbed the worst investor ever.

, Son ranks 67th on the Forbes list of The World's Billionaires 2022, despite having had for many years the distinction of being the person who had lost the most money in history (more than $59bn during the dot com crash of 2000 alone, when his SoftBank shares plummeted), a feat now surpassed by Elon Musk in the following decades due to the volatile nature of the stock market, the shortcomings of financial risk and unavoidable changes in asset valuation.

Son was named the world's 45th most powerful person by Forbes Magazine's List of The World's Most Powerful People.

Early life and education
Masayoshi Son was born as the second of four sons in Tosu (鳥栖市, Tosu-shi), a city in the eastern part of Saga Prefecture on the island of Kyushu, Japan.

Son is a 3rd generation Zainichi Korean. Zainichi Koreans are ethnic Koreans with permanent residency or citizenship in Japan. Son's grandfather, Son Jong-kyung, moved from Daegu to Japan during the Japanese colonial period, where he worked as a miner. His father is Son Sam-heon.

His father and other Koreans illegally built their houses on land that was owned by Japan National Railways, which caused them trouble with the authorities. His father raised pigs and chickens on that land, and started an illegal sake business that eventually became successful enough for his family to become the first people in town to own a car. His family eventually moved out of the neighborhood so that Son could attend a better school.

Son pursued his interests in business by securing a meeting with Japan McDonald's president Den Fujita. Taking his advice, Son began studying English and computer science.

He left to study in the U.S. on the advice of Den Fujita. At age 16, Son moved from Japan to California and lived with his friends and family in South San Francisco. He finished high school in three weeks by taking the required exams at Serramonte High.

Son attended the University of California, Berkeley. At age 19, Son became confident that computer technology would ignite the next commercial revolution after being enamoured by a microchip featured in a magazine.

He began his first business endeavours while still a student. With the help of some professors, Son created an electronic translator that he sold to Sharp Corporation for $1.7 million. He made another $1.5 million by importing used video game machines from Japan, on credit and installing them in dormitories and restaurants.

Son graduated from Berkeley with a B.A. in Economics in 1980, and started a video game company called Unison World in Oakland, CA. He later sold the company to an associate for close to $2 million, and the company was eventually acquired by Kyocera.

Son used his family's adopted Japanese surname for much of his childhood. However, after he returned to Japan, Son decided to use his family's original Korean surname instead. For this action and other similar ones, Son is considered to be a role model for ethnic Korean children in Japan.

SoftBank 
Founder, CEO and largest shareholder of SoftBank, by December 2022, Masayoshi Son had a stake of 34.2% in the company.

Yahoo! and Alibaba 
Son was an early investor in internet firms, buying a share of Yahoo! in 1995 and investing a $20 million stake into Alibaba in 1999; he was briefly the richest person in the world before the stock market crashed. Son's holding company SoftBank owns 29.5% of Alibaba, which is worth around $108.7 billion as of 23 October 2018. Although SoftBank's stake in Yahoo! had dwindled to 7%, Son established Yahoo! BroadBand in September 2001 with Yahoo! Japan in which he still owned a controlling interest. After a severe devaluation of SoftBank's equity, Son was forced to focus his attention on Yahoo! BB and BB Phone. So far, SoftBank has accumulated about $1.3 billion in debt. Yet, Yahoo! BB acquired Japan Telecom, the then third largest broadband and landline provider with 600,000 residential and 170,000 commercial subscribers. Yahoo! BB is now Japan's leading broadband provider. In June 2020, Son stepped down from the Alibaba board.

Arm Holdings 
In July 2016, SoftBank announced plans to acquire Arm Holdings for £23.4 billion ($31.4 billion) which would be the largest ever purchase of a European technology company. In September 2016, SoftBank announced that the transaction was complete. The total acquisition price was approximately £24 billion ($34 billion).

In 2020, SoftBank Group agreed to sell U.K. chip designer Arm Limited to U.S. chip-maker Nvidia in a cash and stock deal initially worth $40 billion. The buy price, initially set at $40bn (cash and Nvidia shares) when first announced in September 2020, had risen closer to an estimated $66bn by 2022 given the intervening hike in Nvidia's stock – that would make this deal the biggest deal in the semiconductor market. Announcing the deal, SoftBank said the combination of Arm and Nvidia would create a computing company "that will lead the era" of artificial intelligence. However, the deal with Nvidia failed as announced in February 2022.

Sprint Corporation 
In the 2010s, through his holdings in SoftBank, Son bought a 76% share in Sprint. SoftBank has further accumulated shares in Sprint to about 84% ownership.

Solar power 
In response to the Fukushima Daiichi nuclear disaster in 2011, Masayoshi Son criticized the nuclear industry for creating "the problem that worries Japanese the most today" and engaged in investing in a nationwide solar power network for Japan. In March 2018, it was announced that Son was investing in the biggest ever solar project, a 200GW development planned for Saudi Arabia as part of its Vision 2030.

In July 2018, coverage indicated that Son "would underwrite most of 100 GW" of a planned 275 GW of new renewable provision in India by 2027.

Vision Fund 
Established in 2017, SoftBank Group's investment vehicle, the $100 billion Vision Fund, was intended to invest in emerging technologies like artificial intelligence (AI), robotics and the internet of things. As of 2019, it aimed to nearly double its portfolio of AI companies from 70 to 125. However, it also invested in companies supposedly focused on revolutionizing real estate, transportation, and retail. Son claimed he would make personal connections with the CEOs of all companies funded by Vision Fund in order to enhance the creation of intertwined synergies among those companies. Son planned to raise $100 billion for a new fund every few years, investing about $50 billion a year in startups. In 2019, a second Vision Fund was created with a target of $108 billion, of which $38 billion would come from Softbank itself. But the amount was scaled down due to lack of investing partners beyond Softbank Group itself and Masayoshi Son.

As of 2020, the first fund had invested in 88 companies including Coupang, Didi, Doordash, Fanatics, Grab, Oyo, Paytm Uber, and WeWork, but had experienced an awkward fall from grace as the COVID-19 pandemic and a Chinese anti-monopoly crackdown accelerated the exposure of the Japanese investment management conglomerate's portfolio weaknesses. Son became noted as a stock investor after the meteoric rise of Alibaba Group. He had invested $20 million in Jack Ma's Alibaba back in 2000 when it was a young Chinese startup company although regrettably passing up early opportunities to invest in both Amazon and Tesla. In addition, he raised his global profile as stock investor since starting Softbank Vision Fund in 2017, creating an unprecedented investment vehicle of almost $100 billion to back technology startups. But by 2021, he was still struggling to persuade investors of the value of his efforts, in part because of fiascoes and troublesome losses with companies such as WeWork, OneWeb, Wirecard, OYO Rooms, Katerra or Greensill Capital, and SoftBank Group's own stock chronically traded far below the value of its assets reflecting a discount associated to tax liabilities, risk, past performance, losses, performance fees and high probability of occurrence of several haircuts given Son’s poor track record while running the Vision Fund and high enthusiasm for investing vast sums in loss-making companies at eye-popping valuations. By October 2021, Masayoshi Son had accelerated the pace of his startup investments quintupling the number of companies in his Vision Fund 2 portfolio in less than 9 months, SoftBank was cutting more deals with fewer staff than ever and the average investment amount per company had fallen from $943 million in Vision Fund 1 to $192 million in Vision Fund 2. In 2022, SoftBank Vision Fund posted a record 3.5 trillion yen loss ($27.4 billion) for its financial year ended on 31 March 2022 as the valuation of its stock portfolio plummeted. SoftBank's bad timing-prone, impulsive investment decisions regarding previously overhyped and consequently overvalued startups like Klarna, had plunged in value while some other investment firms had even been able to cash in before the startups' comedown to reap hundreds of millions of dollars in profit. In August 2022, Masayoshi Son said he was “embarrassed” and “ashamed” when asked to talk about the way he had run the SoftBank Vision Fund and Barron's characterized the fund as a “failed experiment” while The Wall Street Journal called SoftBank a “big loser" and Bloomberg elaborated on “Masayoshi Son’s broken business model."

By November 2022, according to the Financial Times, Masayoshi Son personally owed SoftBank $4.7bn because of growing losses on the Japanese conglomerate’s technology bets, which have also rendered the value of his stake in the group’s second Vision Fund worthless. By February 2023, this personal debt totaled $5.1 billion according to Bloomberg calculations based on company disclosures. This debt on side deals he set up at SoftBank Group Corp. to boost his compensation, as losses mounted at its core Vision Fund venture capital arm, sparked controversy due to corporate governance concerns, but Son insisted that there wasn’t any conflict of interest.

Personal life 
Son met his wife, Masami Ohno, the daughter of a prominent Japanese doctor, while both were students at the University of California, Berkeley. They have two daughters. He lives in Tokyo in a three-story mansion that is valued at $50 million and that has a golf range with technology to mimic the weather conditions and temperature of the world’s top golf courses. He has also bought a home near Silicon Valley in Woodside, California, that cost him $117 million. He owns the SoftBank Hawks, a professional Japanese baseball team. Son has three brothers and is the second oldest of the siblings. His youngest brother, Taizo Son, is a serial entrepreneur and investor, having founded GungHo Online Entertainment and the venture capital firm Mistletoe.

When he went to the United States at 16 to attend high school and then the University of California Berkeley, he decided to use his real Korean surname. "If I had stayed all the time in Japan, Mr. Son said, I probably would have become much more conservative, just as other Japanese."

Philanthropy 
In 2011 Son pledged to donate 10 billion yen ($120 million) and his remaining salary until retirement to support victims of the 2011 Tōhoku earthquake and tsunami.

References

External links 
 .
 

1957 births
Baseball executives
Businesspeople in telecommunications
Japanese billionaires
Japanese chief executives
Japanese people of Korean descent
Japanese sports businesspeople
Living people
20th-century Japanese businesspeople
21st-century Japanese businesspeople
People from Saga Prefecture
SoftBank people
Naturalized citizens of Japan
Sprint Corporation
UC Berkeley College of Engineering alumni
Japanese chairpersons of corporations
Japanese company founders
Iljik Son clan
Japanese transhumanists
Japanese inventors
People named in the Pandora Papers